Defending champion Esther Vergeer and her partner Marjolein Buis defeated Sabine Ellerbrock and Yui Kamiji in the final, 6–0, 6–1 to win the women's doubles wheelchair tennis title at the 2012 French Open.

Vergeer and Sharon Walraven were the defending champions, but did not participate together. Walraven partnered Annick Sevenans, but was defeated in the semifinals by Ellerbrock and Kamiji.

Seeds
 Annick Sevenans /  Sharon Walraven (semifinals)
 Marjolein Buis /  Esther Vergeer (champions)

Draw

Finals

References
Main Draw

Wheelchair Women's Doubles
French Open, 2012 Women's Doubles